Mohammad Parvin (born 14 June 1988) is an Iranian former footballer who played as a midfielder. He retired in 2014. He is the son of Ali Parvin, a legendary Iranian football player.

Club career
Mohammad Parvin began his career at the Persepolis youth academy in Tehran before signing his first pro contract in 2005. Despite the fact that his father was the head coach of the team, he remained unused until making his debut in a friendly match against German giants Bayern Munich. Being dubbed as a future star player in the national team, his time at Persepolis turned difficult following his fathers departure as a coach. He later followed his Parvin senior, who had become technical director of Steel Azin, and became the top scorer in the first division. Following a remarkable season in a star-studded second tier side, he chose to move soon, again shortly after his fathers resignation. Despite reportedly being offered a contract by Persepolis, he moved to Saipa. After only 12 performances at Saipa, he spent 6 successful months on loan at Dunajská Streda in Europe only to return to his beloved Persepolis in July 2009. His second stint at the continents most popular football team, was another difficult experience and Mohammad was on the move once again in 2011. His next stop was Paykan, another short term stint as soon newly promoted Gahar Zagros followed.

It is often argued that his lackluster performance and much traveled resume is a result of the pressure that comes along the name of Parvin, and his fathers publicized involvement in Iranian football.

Club career statistics
Last Update: 10 May 2013 

 Assist Goals

International career
After becoming the top scorer in first division he was called to Team Melli in July 2008 and played in WAFF Championship 2008.

Honours

Club
Persepolis
Hazfi Cup (2): 2009–10, 2010–11

Individual
Azadegan League top goalscorer (1): 2007–08 with Steel Azin (15 goals)

References
Iran Pro League Stats

1988 births
Living people
People from Tehran
Iranian footballers
Persepolis F.C. players
Steel Azin F.C. players
Saipa F.C. players
Paykan F.C. players
FC DAC 1904 Dunajská Streda players
Gahar Zagros players
Persian Gulf Pro League players
Azadegan League players
Slovak Super Liga players
Iranian expatriate footballers
Iranian expatriate sportspeople in Slovakia
Expatriate footballers in Slovakia
Association football midfielders
Iran international footballers